SkinnyPop is an American brand of dairy-free popcorn currently owned by Hershey Co. after it acquired its former owner, Amplify Snack Brands Inc., for US$1.6 billion in 2017.

History 

SkinnyPop was founded in 2010 in Skokie, Illinois by Andy Friedman and Pam Netzky, with investors Jeffrey and Michael Eiserman. Friedman and Netzky first entered the popcorn business in 2007 when they launched Wells Street Popcorn, which they sold in grocery stores and theaters near Chicago. In 2010, Friedman and Netzky developed a new popcorn recipe and launched a separate brand from Wells Street, which they named SkinnyPop Popcorn. The first thousand bags of SkinnyPop were hand-produced by the company's founders and sold locally in Chicago stores. In October 2010, SkinnyPop signed with a distributor. Due to time constraints from managing two brands, Friedman and Netzky franchised Wells Street Popcorn to Netzky's cousin at the end of 2010.

By 2012, SkinnyPop was being manufactured in Chicago and distributed to 4,500 retail stores. In early 2013, the company partnered with a food industry entrepreneur Jason Cohen to grow sales and distribution. That year, SkinnyPop recorded $44 million in sales. By August 2014, SkinnyPop was being sold in 25,000 retail stores in the United States as well as internationally. That same year, Friedman and Netzky sold their majority stake in the company to TA Associates for $320 million. TA Associates hired Tom Ennis, former president of Oberto Brands, to be the company's CEO and reincorporated SkinnyPop as Amplify Snack Brands.

Initial public offering and sale to Hershey 
Amplify Snack Brands went public in 2015 with an initial public offering of $18 per share. That year, the company's sales were $176.9 million. Amplify shares hit a low in January 2016. They recovered later that year, but did not reach the initial IPO. In 2016, sales grew to $326.9 million. In December 2017, Hershey Co. purchased Amplify Snack Brands for $1.6 billion at $12 a share.

Products 
SkinnyPop's original pre-popped popcorn was launched in 2010 and was made with sunflower oil and salt. Different flavors were later introduced. The company released a microwave popcorn product in 2017. Its other products include popcorn puffs and rice cakes.

References

External links

 

Popcorn brands
The Hershey Company brands
Products introduced in 2010
2017 mergers and acquisitions